National Route 471 is a national highway of Japan connecting between Hakui, Ishikawa and Takayama, Gifu in Japan, with a  total length of .

See also

References

471
Roads in Gifu Prefecture
Roads in Ishikawa Prefecture
Roads in Toyama Prefecture